The Nokia 3250 (code-named Thunder) is a smartphone running Symbian OS v9.1 (S60 3rd Edition), announced on 26 September 2005. It features a unique 'twist' design that transforms the traditional phone keypad into a camera (90° CW/CCW) and dedicated music control keys (180° CCW). It was marketed as a music phone and can store up to 2 gigabytes of music (500 songs) and other data thanks to a microSD memory card slot, and features a two-megapixel camera as well as other smartphone capabilities.

The triband GSM 900/1800/1900 model started shipping in the first quarter of 2006 with an estimated retail price of 300 EUR before subsidies or taxes.

Specification sheet

Key features
 Twist: 3 twists for 3 modes of operation
 Optimized, easy to use music player: Music collection management and playlist editing in device
 2-megapixel camera with 4x zoom
 10 MB internal memory, hot swappable microSD up to 1 GB. The phone can now take a 2 GB MicroSD with firmware V3.24 and above.
 Sales package includes 512 MB microSD inbox
 GSM/EDGE 900/1800/1900
 USB 2.0 Full Speed with Mass Storage profile
 Stereo am Radio playback including Visual Radio functionality
 Tutorial Application
 Sound Meter application
 Picture editor
 Movie maker
 Lifeblog application
 Setting Wizard (automatically sets the configuration settings of the phone for e-mail and network)
 Comes standard with a full web browser

Music
 Playback time: up to 10 hours
 Supports microSD cards up to 2 GB (1500 songs, with latest firmware)
 Supports WMA, M4A, MP3, AAc, eAAC and eAAC+ music files
 Audio setting include different equalizer settings, Stereo Widening and Bass Boost
 Nokia Audio Manager
 Music Library

Camera
 Resolution of images: 1600x1200 (default), 1152x864, 640x480
 Resolution of videos: 176x144, 128x96
 Streaming and video capture: H.263, 3GPP and Real V8

Connectivity
 USB Data Cable
 Bluetooth
 Nokia PC Suite

References

External links

 Manufacturer link 
 Symbian's 3250 overview 
 Nokia Mexico

Reviews
 Mobile Review
 All About Symbian
 GSM Arena
 infoSync World
 Nokia 3250 reviews and specifications roundup
 Mobile Today - Retailer Review

Mobile phones introduced in 2006
Nokia smartphones
Mobile phones with user-replaceable battery